Rumer Glenn Willis (born August 16, 1988) is an American actress. She is the eldest daughter of actor Bruce Willis and actress Demi Moore. She has appeared in films Hostage (2005), The House Bunny (2008), Sorority Row (2009) and Once Upon a Time in Hollywood (2019). She portrayed Gia Mannetti in CBS' teen drama series 90210 (2009–10) and Tory Ash in FOX's musical drama series Empire (2017–18).
Willis won season 20 of ABC's dance competition television series Dancing with the Stars. She made her Broadway debut in Chicago as Roxie Hart on September 21, 2015.

Early life
Rumer Glenn Willis was born on August 16, 1988, at Western Baptist Hospital in Paducah, Kentucky, while her father, Bruce Willis, was filming In Country. She was named after author Rumer Godden. Her mother, actress Demi Moore, hired a cameraman to videotape her birth. She has two younger sisters, Scout LaRue Willis (born 1991), and Tallulah Belle Willis (born 1994), as well as two younger paternal half-sisters from her father's marriage to model Emma Heming, born in April 2012 and May 2014.

Raised in Hailey, Idaho, Willis enrolled as a freshman at the Interlochen Arts Academy in Interlochen, Michigan. In January 2004, she enrolled as a sophomore at Wildwood Secondary School in Los Angeles, California. She attended the University of Southern California for one semester before dropping out.

Career
In 1995, Willis made her film debut alongside her mother in Now and Then. The following year she appeared in Striptease (1996). She has worked with her father three times: in The Whole Nine Yards in 2000, Hostage in 2005 and Air Strike in 2018. She portrayed Joanne in the comedy film The House Bunny (2008) alongside Emma Stone, Colin Hanks and Anna Faris. The film was a commercial success, grossing $70 million worldwide. She played Natalie Wilburn in the horror film From Within (2008), which premiered at the Tribeca Film Festival on April 25, 2008. In 2009, she appeared in two films, the slasher film Sorority Row and the high school comedy film Wild Cherry. She won "Breakthrough Performance Female" award at Young Hollywood Awards for her performance in Wild Cherry. She was nominated for "Choice Movie Actress: Horror/Thriller" at Teen Choice Awards for Sorority Row. In 2013, Willis landed the lead role of Maya in the drama film The Odd Way Home. She also appeared in films There's Always Woodstock (2014), Return to Sender (2014), The Escort (2015) and Hello Again (2017).

She had guest roles in television shows Miss Guided, Army Wives, CSI: NY, Medium, The Secret Life of the American Teenager, Hawaii Five-0 and Workaholics. Willis portrayed Gia Mannetti in ten episodes of the teen drama television series 90210 (2009–2010). In May 2013, The Hollywood Reporter announced that Willis will portray Zoe in the fourth season of Freeform's teen drama series Pretty Little Liars. She was a judge at Miss USA beauty pageant in 2014. In May 2015, Willis and professional dancer Valentin Chmerkovskiy won season 20 of ABC's dance competition television series Dancing with the Stars. From September 21 to November 1, 2015, Willis starred as Roxie Hart in Chicago on Broadway. W magazine noted that the past six months have been "a major breakout" for Willis." W magazine praised "her astonishing routines on the spring season of the show Dancing with the Stars, which she won with her partner Valentin Chmerkovskiy, that propelled Willis to new heights of fame. It also revealed the actress-singer to be a triple threat."

In 2016, she had a voice role on the stop-motion sketch comedy series Robot Chicken, in the episode "Yogurt in a Bag." On March 22, 2017, she had a recurring role in the third season of FOX's musical drama series Empire as Tory Ash. She became a series regular in Empire during the show's fourth season. In 2019, she appeared as a guest co-host in three episodes of CBS' talk show The Talk.

On February 20, 2019, she was revealed to be "Lion" on the first season of Fox's reality singing competition series The Masked Singer. Entertainment Weekly wrote that "Willis had commanded the stage with her vocal prowess and magnetic presence during the last eight weeks of the competition, proving time and again how powerful and versatile her singing skills truly are."

Willis portrayed Joanna Pettet in the comedy-drama film Once Upon a Time in Hollywood (2019) written and directed by Quentin Tarantino. The film has grossed $368.9 million worldwide, with The Hollywood Reporter writing that critics had "an overall positive view" of the film, calling it "Tarantino's love letter to '60s L.A."

Other ventures 
She has appeared on the cover of several magazines, such as Page Six, Prestige and Us Weekly, and pictorials for Vanity Fair, Harper's Bazaar and The Sunday Times. In 2008, Willis ventured into the role of spokesperson for clothing brand Ocean Pacific.

Dancing with the Stars
On February 24, 2015, Willis was announced as one of the celebrities to compete on season 20 of Dancing with the Stars. Her professional partner was Valentin Chmerkovskiy. Her performance during week 1 earned her the highest score of the night (32 out of 40), and her performance during two rounds of competition in week 8 landed her two perfect scores.

On May 19, 2015, Willis and Chmerkovskiy were crowned the season's champions, winning over singer and actor Riker Lynch and army veteran Noah Galloway who took second and third place, respectively. Willis joined partner Valentin Chmerkovskiy and other Dancing with the Stars professionals on the 40-city "Dancing with the Stars: Perfect 10 Tour" during the summer of 2015.

Personal life 
Since 2022, Willis has been in a relationship with singer Derek Richard Thomas. On December 20, 2022, Willis announced that she is pregnant with her first child.

Filmography

References

External links

 
 Rumer Willis at Miss USA 2014

1988 births
20th-century American actresses
21st-century American actresses
Actresses from Kentucky
American child actresses
American film actresses
American people of German descent
American television actresses
Living people
Musicians from Paducah, Kentucky
People from Hailey, Idaho
University of Southern California alumni
Dancing with the Stars (American TV series) winners
Participants in American reality television series